"Hold On" is a song by American vocal group Wilson Phillips, released on February 27, 1990, as the lead single from their debut studio album, Wilson Phillips (1990). The song topped the US Billboard Hot 100 for a week in June 1990 and was the most successful single of that year in the US. The song won the Billboard Music Award for Hot 100 Single of the Year for 1990. At the Grammy Awards of 1991, "Hold On" received a nomination for Song of the Year, losing to "From a Distance" by Julie Gold and performed by Bette Midler.

In 2017, Billboard ranked the song number 15 on their list of "100 Greatest Girl Group Songs of All Time". In 2020, Cleveland.com ranked it at number 37 in their list of the best Billboard Hot 100 No. 1 song of the 1990s. In 2022, Pitchfork ranked number 246 in their list of "The 250 Best Songs of the 1990s".

Background
Chynna Phillips wrote the song's lyrics while battling substance abuse as well as being in a "really bad" relationship. She explained to Kelly Clarkson, "I just said if I don't change my course, I'm going to be in a lot of trouble." Producer Glen Ballard presented the track to the group, noting it needed lyrics. Phillips based the lyrics off of the principles taught in AA, specifically the idea that things had to be taken "one day at a time." The next day, Phillips returned with "Hold On" and sang it for the Wilsons and Ballard, who immediately loved it. "I remember one guy I played it for said, 'That's not going to go anywhere. That's not a very good song. It's really corny,'" Phillips recalls. "I just remember thinking to myself, 'God, I hope he's wrong.'"

Commercial performance
"Hold On" became Wilson Phillips' first number one single, reaching the top spot of the Billboard Hot 100 on June 9, 1990, and, despite spending only one week at number one, was ranked the top song of the year by Billboard. (This was the second and most recent concurrence of this to date, the first of which was "Stranger on the Shore" by "Mr." Acker Bilk in 1962.) The song also spent a week atop the adult contemporary chart that same year. In Europe, "Hold On" peaked at number six on the UK Singles Chart; this was in large part due to a performance by the group on the legendary British music series Top of the Pops a week prior to the song's peak position. Additionally, it was a top 10 hit also in Belgium, Ireland and Sweden, while peaking within the top 20 in the Netherlands, Switzerland and West Germany.

Despite being number one on the US year-end for 1990, the song did not appear on the 1990s decade-end chart. It does, however, appear on Billboard's 60th anniversary "All-time chart" at number 228, ahead of many songs that do appear on the decade-end chart.

Critical reception
Alex Henderson from AllMusic felt that the song is not "remotely convincing." J.D. Considine from The Baltimore Sun complimented it as "a tough-but-tuneful paean to self-reliance" and "irresistibly catchy". Bill Coleman from Billboard described it as an "engaging and melodic pop confection". In 2020, Tony L. Smith from Cleveland.com wrote, "A decade or two ago, Wilson Phillips' inspirational anthem "Hold On" wasn't regarded as anything more than a cheesy (maybe the cheesiest) pop song from the Nineties. But opinions change. For a generation big on nostalgia, it gets no bigger than "Hold On", a song that has good times written all over it." The Daily Vault's Christopher Thelen stated in his review of Wilson Phillips, that it's the "defining moment" for the album, "setting the tone for what was to come as well as letting the listener know that all they have to do is sit back and enjoy the ride." A reviewer from Music & Media called the song "melodic, well crafted and extremely catchy", and "everything you would expect from a band madeup of daughters of rock stars." David Quantick from NME felt the single "is fine and rather thrashes everything else here [on the album]. However, since it was one of the songs here written by the cowboy-booted threesome, it bodes well for the future."

Music video
A music video was produced to promote the single, directed by English film, documentary and music video director Julien Temple. It begins with aerial shots of a mountain side. Wilson Phillips sings as they sit on the side of the mountain. Later, they sing as they sit together on the beach by the ocean. The video was later published on the group's official YouTube channel in March 2009. It has amassed more than 76 million views as of September 2022.

Track listings
 US CD single
 "Hold On" (single fade) 3:40
 "Hold On" 4:35

 US and Canadian 7-inch vinyl and cassette single
 "Hold On" – 3:30
 "Over And Over" – 4:40

 UK CD
 "Hold On" (single version) 3:42
 "Hold On" (album version) 4:25
 "Over and Over" 4:27

 West German maxi-CD
 "Hold On"
 "Over and Over"
 "A Reason to Believe"

Charts

Weekly charts

Year-end charts

Certifications

In popular culture
Harold & Kumar sing the song as a duet while they are driving in the film Harold & Kumar Go to White Castle.

The song was featured in the finale of the 2011 film Bridesmaids, performed by the band members as themselves, bringing renewed recognition to Wilson Phillips.

On December 4, 2011, during the eighth series of the British version of The X Factor, the semi-finalists covered the song. It would later be covered five years afterwards on the same TV show by Four of Diamonds.

See also
List of European number-one airplay songs of the 1990s

References

1989 songs
1990 debut singles
Billboard Hot 100 number-one singles
Cashbox number-one singles
Music videos directed by Julien Temple
SBK Records singles
Song recordings produced by Glen Ballard
Songs about heartache
Songs about suicide
Songs written by Glen Ballard
Wilson Phillips songs